The canton of Conches-en-Ouche is an administrative division of the Eure department, northern France. Its borders were modified at the French canton reorganisation which came into effect in March 2015. Its seat is in Conches-en-Ouche.

It consists of the following communes:

Aulnay-sur-Iton
Beaubray
La Bonneville-sur-Iton
Burey
Caugé
Champ-Dolent
Claville
Collandres-Quincarnon
Conches-en-Ouche
La Croisille
Faverolles-la-Campagne
Ferrières-Haut-Clocher
La Ferrière-sur-Risle
Le Fidelaire
Gaudreville-la-Rivière
Gauville-la-Campagne
Glisolles
Louversey
Nagel-Séez-Mesnil
Nogent-le-Sec
Ormes
Parville
Portes
Saint-Élier
Sainte-Marthe
Sébécourt
Tilleul-Dame-Agnès
Le Val-Doré
Les Ventes

References

Cantons of Eure